Albela   is a Bollywood film released in 1971. It was directed by A. Shamsher and produced by Sanat Kothari.

Synopsis 
Mahesh, a stage artist, receives a telegram of his father's last hours on the stage but he refuses to leave the play half way, and goes home after the show is over. His father takes a promise from his son that after his death he would facilitate his sister's marriage in a highly reputed and wealthy family.

His friend Jago finds a prince named Sunil, son of Sardar Gajraj Singh Ghansu. He also finds out that Sunil is a bachelor. In order to find appropriate attire for the proposal, he steals a king's costume from a theater.  Drama ensues.

Cast

 Mehmood 
 Aruna Irani 
 Rajendra Nath 
 I. S. Johar 
 Achala Sachdev 
 Leela Mishra 
 Lalita Kumari 
 Baby Guddi 
 Namrata (Introducing)
 Anwar
 Gajanan Jagirdar
 Ramesh Deo
 Dhumal
 Mukri
 Asit Kumar Sen as Asit Sen
 S. N. Banerjee
 Mohan Choti
 Mirza Musharraf
 Johnny Whisky
 Dilip Dutt
 Brahmachari
 Moolchand
 Daulat Ram
 Jerry
 Ram Swarup
 Bharat Parekh

Rest of cast listed alphabetically
 Anwar Ali as Hero
 Tun Tun as fat woman in swimming pool

Soundtrack
The music has been directed by Shankar - Jaikishan.

Track listing
"Devta Mana Aur Pooja" - Lata Mangeshkar, Kishore Kumar
"Ae Mere Dil" - Lata Mangeshkar
"Devta Mana Aur Poojaa" - Lata Mangeshkar
"Aye Mere Dil v2" - Kishore Kumar
"Main Hoon Albela" - Kishore Kumar
"Sultanon Ka Sultan" - Kishore Kumar, Mehmood
"Tera Dil Mere Dil Se Jo Aan Mila" - Noor Jehan

Versions and legacy
Albela is a recurrent classic name for Bollywood films, and they share similar themes.  This version was antedated by Albela (1951 film) iteration. It was thereafter followed by Albela (1986 film) and Albela (2001 film) versions.  These are musicals, with a Pyygmalion/My Fair Ladyesque cant.

References

External links
 

1971 films
1970s Hindi-language films
1971 drama films
Films scored by Shankar–Jaikishan